Paddi may refer to:

 Patricia Paddi Edwards (1931–1999), English-born American actress
 Emmanuel Paddi, Ghanaian tennis player - see 1989 Davis Cup Africa Zone Group II (also 1992–1995)
 Paddi, a character in the Chinese animated series Pleasant Goat and Big Big Wolf
 PADDI, the first disposable nappy (diaper), invented by Valerie Hunter Gordon

See also
 Paddy (disambiguation)
 Padi (disambiguation)